Ebanie Bridges (born 22 September 1986) is an Australian professional boxer. She has held the IBF female bantamweight title since March 2022. As an amateur, Bridges competed in the women's bantamweight event at the 2016 and 2017 Australasian Golden Gloves, respectively, where she won gold. She has been nicknamed the 'Blonde Bomber' due to her hair colour and her coach Arnel "Bomber" Barotillo.

Early life
Bridges was born on 22 September 1986 and grew up in the Toongabbie suburb of Greater Western Sydney — the youngest child of three. She is the younger of twins by six minutes, and the only girl in her family. At the age of five, Bridges's parents introduced her to Karate — in which she competed until thirteen years of age. Shortly after, she trained in Kickboxing and Muay Thai at secondary school. She later found competitive bodybuilding — under the tutelage of Arina Manta – in which she competed for eight years and won numerous regional and state titles. She spoke of her teenage years being tough, though with her parents’ help she overcame the difficulties: ‘At 18, I decided I need to change my life.’ When growing up, Bridges admired Kostya Tszyu, Anthony Mundine, Oscar De La Hoya, and Roy Jones Jr.

Amateur career
Bridges amassed a 26–4 amateur record from 2016 to 2018, during which she won the 2016 and 2017 National Golden Gloves titles, as well as the state championship titles at bantamweight. She also competed at the Australian Women Selection Tournament in Perth, however, she was defeated by Antonia Kay in the quarter-finals via a points-decision 4:1.

Professional career
On 24 November 2018, Bridges was scheduled to take on Thai fighter Rungnapha Kaewrachang in a bantamweight contest at the Wollongong Fraternity Club, however, the fight was cancelled due to Kaewrachang experiencing fighting clearance issues. Bridges instead fought Bianca Elmir in an exhibition fight, though it was not recognised as a professional bout. Bridges made her professional debut on 8 February 2019 at the Hordern Pavilion in Sydney, on the undercard of Tim Tszyu vs. Denton Vassell against Filipino fighter Mahiecka Pareno (2–1–0), who Bridges defeated via majority decision, while having to get up from the canvas after Pareno dropped her in the first-round. During her fight with Pareno, it was later revealed that Bridges had broken her ankle but continued to carry on.

On 12 October 2019, Bridges fought Laura Woods, who Bridges defeated via TKO in the third-round, and then in the following month had defeated Kanittha Ninthim via second-round TKO.

In February 2020, Bridges signed a promotional contract with Split-T Management. She made her US debut on 8 February 2020, winning a six-round unanimous decision against Crystal Hoy at the Hammond Civic Center in Hammond, Indiana, with judges Jerry Jakubco, Nathan Palmer, and Skylar Slay scoring the fight 60–54 in favour of Bridges. In November 2020, after her defeat of Jorgelina Guanini, Rachel Ball had made her intentions known to face Bridges for the vacant WBA bantamweight title she had initially hoped to contest against Guanini.

On 13 March 2021, Bridges faced Carol Earl for the vacant Australian National Boxing Federation super-bantamweight title at Bankstown City Paceway in Sydney, in which Bridges secured a unanimous decision with Ian Batty, Wayne Douglas and Kevin Hogan scoring the fight 80–72, 80–72 and 79–73 in favour for Bridges. On 14 March, it was confirmed that Bridges would face Shannon Courtenay in a world bantamweight title showdown, for the vacant WBA female bantamweight title, on the undercard of Conor Benn's defence his WBA Continental title against Samuel Vargas at the Copper Box Arena on 10 April. Courtenay had initially been hoped to fight Rachel Ball, however, with Ball recovering from coronavirus, Bridges had stepped in as a late replacement.

After suffering her first professional loss to Courtenay, Bridges was booked to face Bec Connolly on 7 August 2021. She knocked Connolly down twice by the mid-point of the second round, before referee Kieran McCann stopped the bout. Bridges next faced Mailys Gangloff on 4 September 2021. She narrowly won the fight on points, with a scorecard of 77–76.

Bridges challenged the reigning IBF female bantamweight champion María Cecilia Román, in what was Román's eight title defense. The fight took place at the First Direct Arena in Leeds, England on 26 March 2022, on the undercard of the Kiko Martinez and Josh Warrington featherweight title bout. Bridges won the fight by unanimous decision. Two of the judges scored the fight 97–93 in her favor, while the third judge awarded her all ten rounds of the bout.

Personal life
She is a qualified mathematics teacher, at Airds High School, and lives in Dural, New South Wales. While studying to become a maths teacher, she undertook a work placement at Mount Annan High School. While training as an amateur boxer, Bridges earned a Bachelor's degree in Mathematics with a minor in Physical Education at Western Sydney University, followed by a Master's degree in Teaching, during which she graduated at the top of her class. Bridges speaks three languages English, Portuguese and Spanish. She has a black belt in Karate.

Bridges competed in the fourth season of SAS Australia, being eliminated in episode 11.

Bridges is a supporter of English Premier League side Leeds United

Bridges is the trainer for OnlyFans influencer Elle Brooke.

Professional boxing record

See also
 List of IBF female world champions
 List of current female world boxing champions

References

External links
 
 

1986 births
Living people
Australian women boxers
Australian people of German descent
Bantamweight boxers
Super-bantamweight boxers
Australian female karateka
Sportswomen from New South Wales
Boxers from Sydney
Professional bodybuilders
Australian female bodybuilders
Participants in Australian reality television series